Roger A. "Rocky" McIntosh Jr. (born November 15, 1982) is a former American football linebacker. He was drafted in the second round of the 2006 NFL Draft by the Washington Redskins.  He played college football at the University of Miami.

Early life
Roger "Rock" McIntosh grew up in a military family. Rock moved to Ft. Campbell, KY in the 8th grade. Him and another student were the only ones that played basketball for the high school freshman team while in the 8th grade. Rock was always very athletic and flourished in any sport he played. McIntosh went to Ft. Campbell High School and moved to Gaffney during the 10th grade. McIntosh attended and played high school football at Gaffney High School in Gaffney, South Carolina.  During his senior season, he was rated the No. 15 linebacker in the nation and earned All-American honors by SuperPrep.  He was named to the All-South Second Team and was listed as the No. 56 overall player in the South by BorderWars.com.  After the season, McIntosh was named to the South Carolina Shrine Bowl team.

While in high school, McIntosh had a 3.0 grade-point average.

Education 

 The George Washington University – Master of Business Administration (2013)
 The Wharton School – NFL Entrepreneurship Program (2009)
 Harvard Business School – NFL Entrepreneurship Program (2007)
 University of Miami – Bachelor of Arts in Criminology (2006)

College career
McIntosh committed to Clemson University after his junior season, but he re-opened his recruitment after the NCAA investigated whether a Clemson booster had given him and other teammates improper benefits.  McIntosh eventually attended the University of Miami, after also receiving offers from the University of Tennessee and Florida State University.  He played in 46 games (starting 26) at Miami and finished with 266 tackles and nine sacks.

McIntosh graduated with a degree in criminology.

Rocky later attended and obtained his MBA from George Washington University in Washington DC while still playing in the NFL.

2002
After being redshirted in 2001, McIntosh started six games at strongside linebacker as a freshman.  He played his first college game on August 31, 2002, in a win over Florida A&M University.  On September 21, 2002, he started a college game for the first time and recorded four tackles (three solo) and two stops for losses in the win over Boston College.  McIntosh had a season-high ten tackles (six solo) and a tackle for a loss in the win at the West Virginia University.  On January 3, 2003, he played in the 2003 Fiesta Bowl (the 2002 BCS National Championship Game, as part of the Bowl Championship Series) and recorded eight tackles (two solo), including two for losses.  The Hurricanes lost to the Ohio State Buckeyes 31–24 in double overtime.  In his first season, McIntosh recorded 43 tackles (24 solo), eight tackles for a loss, one forced fumble and two pass break ups.

2003
During his sophomore season, McIntosh was limited by a knee injury that slowed him throughout preseason practices.  He underwent arthroscopic surgery and missed the first game against Louisiana Tech.  On November 15, 2003, he made a season-high eight tackles (five solo) in the win over Syracuse University.  On January 1, 2004, he played in the 2004 Orange Bowl, where the Hurricanes won over the Florida State Seminoles.  McIntosh played in 12 games and made 23 tackles (16 solo), including one for a loss of three yards and one pass break up.

2004
As a junior in 2004, McIntosh played in ten games and started nine games at both strongside (six) and middle linebacker (three).  In the season opener against Florida State University, he recorded 11 tackles, including a half sack and two quarterback pressures.  On September 23, 2004, he had a career-high 17 tackles, including two tackles for loss, one quarterback pressure and two pass breakups in a win over the University of Houston.  McIntosh did not play against Wake Forest University due to a shoulder injury and played a limited role in the loss to Virginia Tech the following week.  In that game, he recorded eight tackles, three tackles for loss and one sack.  His shoulder injury returned and he did not play in the 2004 Peach Bowl, where the Hurricanes beat the Florida Gators.

He ranked second on the team with 111 tackles (37 solo), including 13 tackles for a loss, eight quarterback pressures, four sacks, one forced fumble and three pass breakups.  For his efforts, he was voted honorable mention All-ACC and was selected as the Hurricanes Linebacker of the Year.

2005
During his senior season, McIntosh started 11 games and led the Hurricanes in tackles with 89 (50 solo), and had 5.5 sacks and ten tackles for a loss.  After the season, he earned All-ACC honorable mention as a senior.

Professional career

Washington Redskins

2006 season
McIntosh was drafted in the second round (35th overall) of the 2006 NFL Draft by the Washington Redskins.  The Redskins traded a sixth round pick in 2006 and a second round pick in the 2007 NFL Draft to the New York Jets in order to swap second-round picks.  He had minor knee surgery on June 14, 2006, and was signed to the Redskins on July 30, 2006.

In 2006, McIntosh played in 16 regular-season games with two starts and totaled 23 tackles (17 solo) and 25 special teams tackles.  His first professional start was on December 24, 2006, in a 37-31 overtime loss to the St. Louis Rams.  In both of his two starts, McIntosh recorded double digit tackles.

2007 season
In 2007, McIntosh set career highs in games played (14), started (13), tackles (105), solo tackles (70), sacks (3), forced fumbles (3) and fumble recoveries (1).  He recorded his first quarterback sack on Trent Green in a 16-13 overtime win against the Miami Dolphins on September 9, 2007.  On December 16, 2007, McIntosh tore both the ACL and MCL ligaments in a 22-10 victory over the New York Giants after bending his knee awkwardly in a pile in the first quarter.  He was placed on injured reserve on December 19, 2007.  McIntosh was recognized as the Redskins’ nominee for the NFL’s Walter Payton Man of the Year Award.  The award recognizes a player for community service activities as well as excellence on the field.

2008 season
After being put on injury reserve the previous season, McIntosh set career highs in games played (16) and games started (15).  He recorded 87 tackles, two sacks, an interception and two forced fumbles.  On September 21, 2008, he made a season-high 12 tackles, one forced fumble and a half-sack in a win over the Arizona Cardinals.  McIntosh had his first career interception on November 16, 2008 in a loss against the Dallas Cowboys.  In that game, he also recorded eight tackles and two pass breakups.

2009 season
In 2009, McIntosh played in 16 regular season games with 15 starts and finished the season with 94 tackles (64 solo), two interceptions and two forced fumbles.  He recorded seven tackles (two solo) and his first interception of the season (second of his career) in a loss against the Atlanta Falcons on November 8, 2009.

2010 season
When the Redskins switched to a 3-4 defense, McIntosh was converted from an outside linebacker to the right inside linebacker alongside London Fletcher, who was the left inside linebacker. He started fifteen games during the 2010 season and recorded a new career high of 110 tackles as well as two sacks.

2011 season
On August 4, 2011, McIntosh re-signed with the Redskins for one year.
McIntosh started eight games and recorded 65 combined tackles, one sack, and one pass breakup.

St. Louis Rams

2012 season
McIntosh signed with the St. Louis Rams on June 14, 2012. For the Rams' 4-3 defense, he returned to being an outside linebacker as he was before the Redskins' switched to a 3-4 defense. Rocky earned a starting spot and finished the season with 44 tackles,1 sack, and 1 interception.

Detroit Lions

2013 season
McIntosh signed a one-year deal with the Detroit Lions on August 17, 2013. Though he made the 53-man roster after final roster cuts before the start of the 2013 season, he was waived by the Lions after they claimed safety DeJon Gomes off waivers on September 2. He resigned with the team three days later.

NFL statistics

Key
 GP: games played
 COMB: combined tackles
 TOTAL: total tackles
 AST: assisted tackles
 SACK: sacks
 FF: forced fumbles
 FR: fumble recoveries
 FR YDS: fumble return yards 
 INT: interceptions
 IR YDS: interception return yards
 AVG IR: average interception return
 LNG: longest interception return
 TD: interceptions returned for touchdown
 PD: passes defensed

Coaching career
In 2014, McIntosh became a football coach at Flint Hill High School in Oakton, Virginia.  He is also the Upper School Admission Interviewer and Outreach Assistant.

Personal life
McIntosh is the son of Roger McIntosh Sr. and Darcia McIntosh. He has two younger brothers, John and Arthur. He and his wife, Alessia, have two sons, Gavin and Landon McIntosh, and two daughters, Natalie, Camelia, and Landon McIntosh. Natalie is excellent at tennis.  They were married on a beach three days before the 2006 NFL Draft after meeting on his first day of school at the University of Miami.

References

External links
St. Louis Rams bio
Washington Redskins bio
Miami Hurricanes bio
Official Website

1982 births
Living people
People from Gaffney, South Carolina
Players of American football from South Carolina
African-American players of American football
American football linebackers
Miami Hurricanes football players
Washington Redskins players
St. Louis Rams players
Detroit Lions players
People from Roosevelt, New York
21st-century African-American sportspeople
20th-century African-American people